Skaar Banner is a superhero and antihero appearing in American comic books published by Marvel Comics, usually as a supporting character in stories featuring his father, the Hulk, who conceived Skaar with the extraterrestrial Caiera during the 2006–2007 "Planet Hulk" storyline. Created by writer Greg Pak and artist John Romita Jr., he first appeared in What If? Planet Hulk #1 (cover-dated December 2007).

Skaar made his animation debut in the animated series Hulk and the Agents of S.M.A.S.H. (2013–2015), and his live-action Marvel Cinematic Universe (MCU) debut in She-Hulk: Attorney at Law (2022) by Wil Deusner.

Publication history
Skaar first appeared in What If? Planet Hulk #1 (Dec. 2007). Skaar then appeared canonically in World War Hulk #5 (Jan. 2008) a miniseries written by Greg Pak, and illustrated by John Romita, Jr. He subsequently starred in his own ongoing series by Pak, Skaar: Son of Hulk, which ran for 12 issues from 2008 to 2009.

Following the "Planet Skaar" story arc, which resulted in Skaar's arrival on Earth, the book's title changed with issue #13 to Son of Hulk, after which new writer Paul Jenkins focused on Hiro-Kala, another son of Bruce Banner. The series ran until issue #17. The story of Hiro-Kala that begins in these issues continue in a miniseries that ties into the Realm of Kings event, Realm of Kings: Son of Hulk #1-4.

When Greg Pak took over writing chores on The Incredible Hulk with issue #601, Skaar allied himself with a de-powered Bruce Banner.

The character would then appear in the Skaar: King of the Savage Land miniseries by writer Rob Williams, and later appearing as a regular character in the Dark Avengers series, beginning with Dark Avengers #175.

Fictional character biography
Skaar is the son of the Hulk and Caiera the Oldstrong. He was conceived during the Hulk's time on Caiera's home planet of Sakaar. Following the Hulk's departure from the planet, Skaar emerged from a cocoon with the appearance and age equivalency of a human preteen. He matured rapidly, achieving a teenage appearance in just one year. Soon after, Skaar developed the appearance and intelligence of a full-grown adult. To survive, Skaar learned the need to kill as part of his upbringing by the savage creatures of his home planet. He demonstrates himself to be a fierce and capable general, becoming the enemy of Axeman Bone. He later gains the power of the stone-based "Old Power", which allow him to draw energy from the planet itself.

Skaar was able to communicate with the spirit of his supposedly dead mother, Caiera. He fights a war against Axeman Bone, but this only delays his people's escape from the near-destruction of the planet by Galactus, the Devourer of Worlds. Because the planet possesses enough energy to satiate Galactus' hunger for 100,000 years, Caiera takes the Old Power from Skaar as she tries to reason with him. Skaar admits to Caiera that he wanted to clear the evil from the planet. However, the Silver Surfer restores Skaar's Old Power and shows him a vision of the death and destruction of Sakaar, leading Skaar to destroy the evacuation ships. He tells the Surfer that if he does not spare his planet, he will use the Old Power to increase Galactus' hunger and endanger more planets, including those already saved by the Surfer. After the Surfer informs the people of Sakaar that their safety would lead to the death of countless planets, he departs. Caiera denounces Skaar for his decision and absorbs his Old Power. She then exiles him from Sakaar and waits for Galactus to consume her.

Skaar arrives on Earth with the sole desire to kill his father, the Hulk. After conflicts with the United States military, the Fantastic Four and the Warbound, he confronts the Hulk. Unbeknownst to Skaar, the Hulk has changed since his time on Sakaar. After the Hulk engages Skaar, he effortlessly beats him but their fight creates a fissure that endangers a nuclear power plant. Skaar ceases his attack when he realizes that this Hulk is not the "War Hulk" that conceived him, the one he desires to kill. He prevents the fissure from endangering the power plant and declares Earth to be his new home.

Skaar later encounters Bruce Banner, who had been robbed of the ability to become the Hulk by the Red Hulk. Skaar reiterates his desire to kill the Hulk, but he cannot accomplish this by killing him in Banner's form as they had separated into two distinct personas. Bruce offers to teach Skaar how to kill the Hulk should he ever return, but this is a ruse to allow Banner to monitor his "son", and impart fatherly wisdom in the hope of turning the savage warrior into a hero. Skaar demonstrates his ability to use both cunning and physical strength by hurling the villain Juggernaut into outer space. Subsequent lessons by Banner include encounters with Wolverine, Wolverine's son, Daken, Victoria Hand, Moonstone, a mutated Marlo Chandler, Tyrannus, the Mole Man and his army of Moloids.

After defeating the Moloids, Skaar is proclaimed a hero and a parade is held in his honor. Banner confronts the Red Hulk but grows angry. He then teleports to the country of Latveria, supposedly to transform in private but a battle breaks out between the Hulk and the Latverian dictator Doctor Doom. Skaar soon intervenes with the aid of his father's teleportation technology as he wants to prevent Doom from robbing him of the ability to kill the Hulk. Doom overpowers Skaar with magic, reverting him to his human form and revealing that this Hulk is a robot. Banner then arrives to rescue his son, seeing him in his human form for the first time. But Skaar rejects Banner's affection, believing that Banner cares only for his deceased wife. Skaar concludes that his discovery of the teleporter and trip to Latveria are part of another of Banner's "lessons", and reiterates his desire to someday kill him in his Hulk form.

During the "Fall of the Hulks", "World War Hulks", and "Dark Son" storylines, Skaar comes to the aid of the Avengers by battling the Red She-Hulk in a story that involves the villainous group Intelligencia capturing Banner and turning people in Washington, D.C., into Hulks, including the genius Amadeus Cho. Later in the story, Banner re-emerges as the Green Scar, prompting Skaar, who has finally been granted the confrontation he longs for, to attack him. As they fight, the Hulk rescues many innocent bystanders endangered by the battle. Skaar reacts to his father's compassion by ceasing his own assault and reverting to human form, but the Hulk continues fighting. His actions quickly remind him of Banner's own abusive father, reverting him back to his human form. Banner embraces his son, who is finally willing to accept his love. Skaar then sets out on a journey with his father, sister, first cousin once removed Jennifer Walters, Rick Jones, and Betty Ross. Soon after, he senses his brother, Hiro-Kala, approaching Earth.

During the "Chaos War" storyline, Skaar helps his father and his friends in their fight against the forces of Amatsu-Mikaboshi. When it is discovered that Brian Banner has been brought back from the dead and has become a Guilt Hulk/Devil Hulk hybrid, Skaar helps his father fight his grandfather.

Skaar accompanies the Hulk and the Warbound to the Savage Land when they are contacted by Ka-Zar regarding the death of some Sakaarians who were living there. They discover that the insectoid Miek is involved in a plot to use Sakaarian bodies to store his hatchlings. When Skaar refuses to allow the Hulk to harm the hatchlings, Miek attempts to drug Skaar. Following Miek's apparent death, Skaar remains in the Savage Land to keep an eye on the remaining Sakaarians.

Skaar is recruited by Norman Osborn to join the second incarnation of the Dark Avengers. His first fight with the team goes against him when the New Avengers discover them. After the Dark Avengers reveal that they have captured Captain America and are planning to capture the other Avengers to put on trial, Skaar turns on his teammates. It is revealed at that point that Skaar is actually a double agent. He then frees Captain America while the New Avengers defeat the remaining Dark Avengers.

Skaar later travels back to the Savage Land as it reminds him of his home planet. The Hulk in his Doc Green form tracks Skaar there to depower him as part of his plan to depower every gamma mutate on Earth. After a brief fight, Skaar is finally depowered. Doc Green teleports Skaar to Paris along with a backpack full of money so he can start a new and better life under the alias "Santos".

The Abomination's company Green Spring later repowers Skaar. While working for Green Spring, Skaar is dispatched to retrieve the escaped gamma mutate Stockpile. This puts Skaar into conflict with the group Gamma Flight, which comes to Stockpile's defense, and the U.S. Hulkbuster Force, which was formed to stop the threat of gamma mutates. Skaar easily defeats the U.S. Hulkbuster Force, but spares its members' lives.

Powers and abilities
Skaar has powers inherited from both his parents, although this original set has been drained ever since. Like his father, the Hulk, he possesses immense strength, stamina, durability, and healing, as well as enhanced senses. His strength increases whenever enraged such that he could break the Juggernaut's armor, although he was not as strong as the Savage Hulk persona. From his mother, Caiera, he can channel these tectonic energies from the planet, thus granting him mastery over lava and stone with the Old Power – a synthesized form of the Power Cosmic, but highly unstable. Iron Fist is able to daze him with a powerful chi-punch. He could revert to his human form when calm or otherwise incapacitated. However, in Skaar's birth cocoon, he emerged from within the depth of "burning waters" and became resistant to its intense heat.

Other versions
In the 2007 What If? storyline "What if Caiera the Oldstrong had survived the destruction of Sakaar instead of the Hulk?", a 21-year-old version of Skaar appeared near the end, partially seen and obscured by shadows.

In other media

Television
 Skaar appears in Hulk and the Agents of S.M.A.S.H., voiced by Benjamin Diskin. This version is the amnesiac, adopted son of unknown Sakaaran parents whom the Leader brainwashed into becoming his personal enforcer after conquering Sakaar. Throughout the first season, the Leader tasks Skaar with spying on the Hulk. However, Skaar eventually breaks free of the Leader's control and liberates Sakaar with the Agents of S.M.A.S.H.'s help.
 Skaar appears in the Ultimate Spider-Man episode "Contest of Champions", voiced again by Benjamin Diskin.
 Skaar makes a cameo appearance in the Marvel Cinematic Universe / Disney+ series She-Hulk: Attorney at Law episode "Whose Show Is This?", portrayed by Wil Deusner. She-Hulk: Attorney at Law head writer Jessica Gao was unaware if Marvel Studios planned to have Deusner remain in the role for Skaar's future appearances.

Video games
 Skaar appears as a playable character in Lego Marvel's Avengers.
 Skaar appears as a playable character in Lego Marvel Super Heroes 2, voiced by David Menkin.

Collected editions
The series the character has appeared in have been collected into individual volumes:

References

External links

 Skaar at Marvel.com

Characters created by Greg Pak
Characters created by John Romita Jr.
Comics characters introduced in 2007
Fictional characters with superhuman durability or invulnerability
Fictional extraterrestrial–human hybrids in comics
Fictional swordfighters in comics
Fictional twins
Marvel Comics aliens
Marvel Comics hybrids
Marvel Comics mutates
Marvel Comics superheroes
Marvel Comics supervillains
Marvel Comics male superheroes
Marvel Comics male supervillains
Marvel Comics extraterrestrial superheroes
Marvel Comics extraterrestrial supervillains
Marvel Comics characters who are shapeshifters
Marvel Comics characters with accelerated healing
Marvel Comics characters with superhuman senses
Marvel Comics characters with superhuman strength
Marvel Comics characters who can teleport